The 1995–96  Liga Leumit season began on 26 August 1995 and ended on 18 May 1996, with Maccabi Tel Aviv win their second consecutive title.

That season had two rounds, each team played the other teams twice. The two teams that were relegated to Liga Artzit were: Maccabi Jaffa and Beitar Tel Aviv.

Two team from Liga Artzit were promoted at the end of the previous season: Hapoel Kfar Saba and Maccabi Jaffa. The teams relegated were: Maccabi Netanya and Maccabi Ironi Ashdod.

Final table

Results

Top scorers

References
Israel - List of Final Tables RSSSF
Liga Leumit IFA 

Liga Leumit seasons
Israel
1995–96 in Israeli football leagues